Twilight is a 2008 American romantic fantasy film directed by Catherine Hardwicke from a screenplay by Melissa Rosenberg, based on the 2005 novel  of the same name by Stephenie Meyer. It is the first instalment in The Twilight Saga film series. The film stars Kristen Stewart and Robert Pattinson as Bella Swan, a teenage girl, and Edward Cullen, a vampire, respectively, and focuses on the development of Bella and Edward's relationship and the subsequent efforts of Edward and his family to keep Bella safe from another coven of vampires.

The project was in development for approximately three years at Paramount Pictures' MTV Films, during which time a film adaptation that differed significantly from the novel was written. Summit Entertainment acquired the rights to the novel after the project's stagnant development. Melissa Rosenberg wrote a new adaptation of the novel shortly before the 2007–2008 Writers Guild of America strike and sought to be faithful to the novel's storyline. Principal photography began on March 2008 and took 44 days, being completed on May 2; the film was shot in the states of Oregon and Washington.

Twilight premiered in Los Angeles on November 17, 2008, and was theatrically released in the United States on November 21, by Summit Entertainment. Despite receiving mixed reviews from critics, the film grossed over $407 million worldwide. It was released on DVD and Blu-ray Disc on March 21, 2009 and became the most purchased DVD of the year. The soundtrack was released on November 4, 2008.

The film received four sequels, The Twilight Saga: New Moon, The Twilight Saga: Eclipse, The Twilight Saga: Breaking Dawn – Part 1, and The Twilight Saga: Breaking Dawn – Part 2, in 2009, 2010, 2011, and 2012, respectively.

Plot

Seventeen-year-old Bella Swan, leaves Phoenix, Arizona and moves to Forks, a small town located on Washington state's Olympic Peninsula, to live with her father, Charlie, the town's police chief. Her mother, Renée, is remarried to Phil, a minor league baseball player whose career often keeps them on the road.

Bella becomes re-acquainted with Jacob Black, a Native American teen who lives with his father, Billy, on the Quileute Indian Reservation near Forks. She makes friends at her new high school, but finds the mysterious and aloof Cullen siblings particularly intriguing. Bella is seated next to Edward Cullen in biology class on her first day, but he seems repulsed by her. After a week's absence from school, Edward returns and socializes normally with Bella. A few days later, she is nearly struck by a skidding van in the school parking lot. Edward instantaneously covers a distance of over thirty feet, putting himself between Bella and the van, stopping it with only his hand. He subsequently refuses to explain his actions to her, warning her against befriending him. Jacob tells Bella about a long-standing animosity between the Cullens and the Quileutes, and says the Cullens are not allowed on the reservation.

Edward appears out of nowhere and saves Bella a second time. After much research, Bella concludes that Edward has mysterious powers that resemble a vampire's. He eventually confirms this, but says that he and the other Cullens only consume animal blood. They fall in love, and Edward introduces Bella to his vampire family. Carlisle Cullen, the family patriarch, is a doctor at the Forks hospital. Esme is Carlisle's wife and the family matriarch. Alice, Jasper, Emmett, and Rosalie are their informally-adopted children. The family's reaction to Bella is mixed, concerned that the family's secret could be exposed.

Edward and Bella's relationship is jeopardized when three nomadic vampires—James, Victoria, and Laurent—arrive in the Forks area, and are responsible for a series of deaths being investigated as animal attacks. James, a tracker vampire with incredible hunting instincts, is excited by Bella's scent and becomes obsessed with hunting her for sport. Edward and the other Cullens protect Bella, but James tracks her to Phoenix, where she is hiding with Jasper and Alice.

James lures Bella into a trap at an old ballet studio. He attacks her, infecting her with vampire venom. Edward arrives and, after a ferocious battle, subdues James just as other Cullens arrive. Alice, Emmett, and Jasper kill James, decapitating and burning him, as Edward removes the venom from Bella's wrist, preventing her becoming a vampire. In the aftermath, she has suffered a broken leg and is hospitalized. Upon returning to Forks, Edward accompanies Bella to the high school prom, where he refuses her request to transform her into a vampire. They are unaware that James' mate, Victoria, is secretly watching them, plotting revenge for her lover's death.

Cast

 Kristen Stewart as Bella Swan, a seventeen-year-old girl who moves to the small town of Forks, Washington from Phoenix, Arizona and falls in love with Edward Cullen, a vampire. Her life is endangered after James, a sadistic vampire, decides to hunt her.
 Robert Pattinson as Edward Cullen, a 108-year-old vampire who was changed in 1918 and still appears to be seventeen. He is Bella's love interest and eventually falls in love with her. He has the ability to read minds, with the exception of Bella's, along with superhuman speed.
 Peter Facinelli as Carlisle Cullen, a compassionate 300-plus-year-old vampire who looks to be in his early 30s. He serves as the town's physician and is the Cullen family patriarch.
 Elizabeth Reaser as Esme Cullen, Carlisle's vampire wife and the matriarch of the Cullen family.
 Ashley Greene as Alice Cullen, Jasper Hale's mate, a vampire who can see the future based on decisions that people make.
 Kellan Lutz as Emmett Cullen, physically the strongest vampire of the family.
 Nikki Reed as Rosalie Hale, Emmett Cullen's mate, a vampire described as the most beautiful person in the world. She is hostile toward Bella throughout the film, worried that Edward's relationship with a human puts their clan at risk.
 Jackson Rathbone as Jasper Hale, a Cullen family member who can manipulate emotions. He is the newest member of the Cullen family, and thus has the most difficulty maintaining their "vegetarian" diet of feeding only on animal rather than human blood.
 Billy Burke as Charlie Swan, Bella's father and Forks' Chief of Police.
 Cam Gigandet as James Witherdale, the leader of a group of nomadic vampires that intends to kill Bella. He is Victoria's mate and a gifted tracker, due to his unparalleled senses.
 Rachelle Lefevre as Victoria Sutherland, James' mate who assists him in hunting Bella.
 Edi Gathegi as Laurent Da Revin, the most civilized member of James' coven.
 Sarah Clarke as Renée Dwyer, Bella's mother who lives in Arizona with her new husband, Phil.
 Taylor Lautner as Jacob Black, an old childhood friend of Bella and a member of the Quileute tribe.
 Christian Serratos as Angela Weber, one of Bella's new friends in Forks.
 Michael Welch as Mike Newton, one of Bella's new friends who vies for her attention.
 Anna Kendrick as Jessica Stanley, Bella's first friend in Forks.
 Gregory Tyree Boyce as Tyler Crowley, another one of Bella's classmates, also vying for Bella's attention. He nearly hits Bella with his van.
 Justin Chon as Eric Yorkie, another one of Bella's classmates who vies for her attention.
 Solomon Trimble as Sam Uley. Solomon Trimble was credited as "Jacob's friend" in the film, but was widely recognized as playing the part of Sam.
 Krys Hyatt as Embry Call. He was recognized as playing the part of Embry in the Twilight film, though his role was uncredited.
 Gil Birmingham as Billy Black
 Matt Bushell as Phil Dwyer
 José Zúñiga as Mr. Molina
 Ned Bellamy as Waylon Forge
 Ayanna Berkshire as Cora
 Katie Powers as Waitress
 Trish Egan as Ms. Cope

Production

Development
In early 2004, Greg Mooradian of Maverick Films brought an unpublished manuscript of Twilight to David Gale, then executive vice president of Paramount Pictures' MTV Films division, to propose a film adaptation. Gale, in turn, brought it to Paramount's then co-president of production, Karen Rosenfelt, who lobbied to option the rights to the novel. MTV Films eventually acquired the rights in April of the same year and later hired Mark Lord to write a script. The screenplay that was subsequently developed was substantially different from its source material, being more action-oriented. According to Lord, he originally pitched his adaptation as a vampiric take on the play Romeo and Juliet, but MTV Films "wanted to just put in some more action to advance it more and give something more for the male audience. They thought they were going to lose the male audience with too much of a romance." MTV Films was pleased with the script he delivered, which included, among many changes, the character of Bella Swan being a long-distance runner, cursing, using shotguns against vampires who killed her father, being turned into a vampire, and riding "jet skis being chased by the FBI". When talking about MTV Films' original script, author Stephenie Meyer said, "They could have filmed it and not called it Twilight because it had nothing to do with the book, and that's kind of frightening."

Following a change of management at Paramount Pictures, the studio's new president of production Brad Weston told Gale that he believed audiences were not interested in films about vampires and werewolves, after being involved with box-office bomb Cursed at Dimension Films, and development stalled. In January 2006, Paramount put Twilight into turnaround. Rosenfelt, who had left Paramount and came aboard Twilight as a producer, was determined to make the film happen, and attempted to forge a co-production deal between Paramount and Fox 2000 Pictures, where she had a producing deal, but Fox 2000 did no agreed with Paramount's terms. Rosenfelt later tried to generate interest at Fox Atomic, but Fox Atomic passed. In October 2006, Rosenfelt met with Erik Feig, then president of production of Summit Entertainment, and mentioned to him that of all the projects she wished she could make, she thought Twilight had the biggest potential. After their meeting, Feig obtained a copy of the novel, read it, and passed it on to colleagues at Summit, who perceived it as an opportunity to launch a franchise. When Paramount Pictures let the rights to Twilight expire in April 2007, Summit acquired them, agreeing with Meyer that their film adaptation would be more faithful to the novel than MTV Films' version.

Before even having the rights to Twilight, Feig, a fan of director Catherine Hardwicke, talked with Hardwicke on the 2007 Sundance Film Festival about working with Summit Entertainment and sent her five scripts of films the studio was developing, including Mark Lord's draft of Twilight for MTV Films. Hardwicke did not like any of the scripts, but ended up curious about Twilight. She bought a copy of the novel and realized the script she had read had very little to do with the source material, which she soon began envisioning as a film. Following Summit's acquisition of the rights, Hardwicke was set to direct the film and Melissa Rosenberg was hired to write the script in mid-2007.

Rosenberg developed an outline by the end of August, and collaborated with Hardwicke on writing the screenplay during the following month. Rosenberg said Hardwicke "was a great sounding board and had all sorts of brilliant ideas.[...] I'd finish off scenes and send them to her, and get back her notes." Due to the impending Writers Guild of America strike, Rosenberg worked full-time to finish the screenplay before October 31. In adapting the novel, she "had to condense a great deal." Some characters from the novel were not featured in the screenplay, whereas some characters were combined into others. "[O]ur intent all along was to stay true to the book", Rosenberg explained, "and it has to do less with adapting it word for word and more with making sure the characters' arcs and emotional journeys are the same." Hardwicke suggested the use of voice over to convey Bella's internal dialogue – since the novel is told from her point of view – and she sketched some of the storyboards during pre-production.

Adaptation from source material
The filmmakers behind Twilight worked to create a film that was as faithful to the novel as they thought possible when converting the story to another medium. Producer Greg Mooradian said, "It's very important to distinguish that we're making a separate piece of art that obviously is going to remain very, very faithful to the book. [...] But at the same time, we have a separate responsibility to make the best movie you can make." To ensure a faithful adaptation, Meyer was kept very involved in the production process, having been invited to visit the set during filming and even asked to give notes on the script and on a rough cut of the film. Of this process, she said, "It was a really pleasant exchange [between me and the filmmakers] from the beginning, which I think is not very typical. They were really interested in my ideas", and "[...]they kept me in the loop and with the script, they let me see it and said, 'What are your thoughts?' [...] They let me have input on it and I think they took 90 percent of what I said and just incorporated it right in to the script." Meyer fought for one line in particular, one of the most well known from the book about "the lion and the lamb", to be kept verbatim in the film: "I actually think the way Melissa [Rosenberg] wrote it sounded better for the movie [...] but the problem is that line is actually tattooed on peoples' bodies. [...] But I said, 'You know, if you take that one and change it, that's a potential backlash situation. Meyer was even invited to create a written list of things that could not be changed for the film, such as giving the vampires fangs or killing characters who do not die in the book, that the studio agreed to follow in contract. The consensus among critics is that the filmmakers succeeded in making a film that is very faithful to its source material, with one reviewer stating that, with a few exceptions, "Twilight the movie is unerringly faithful to the source without being hamstrung by it."

However, as is most often the case with film adaptations, differences do exist between the film and source material. Certain scenes from the book were cut from the film, such as a biology room scene where Bella's class does blood typing. Hardwicke explains, "Well [the book is] almost 500 pages—you do have to do the sweetened condensed milk version of that. [...] We already have two scenes in biology: the first time they're in there and then the second time when they connect. For a film, when you condense, you don't want to keep going back to the same setting over and over. So that's not in there." The settings of certain conversations in the book were also changed to make the scenes more "visually dynamic" on-screen, such as Bella's revelation that she knows Edward is a vampire—this happens in a meadow in the film instead of in Edward's car as in the novel. A biology field trip scene is added to the film to condense the moments of Bella's frustration at trying to explain how Edward saved her from being crushed by a van. The villainous vampires are introduced earlier in the film than in the novel. Rosenberg said that "you don't really see James and the other villains until to the last quarter of the book, which really won't work for a movie. You need that ominous tension right off the bat. We needed to see them and that impending danger from the start. And so I had to create back story for them, what they were up to, to flesh them out a bit as characters." Rosenberg also combined some of the human high school students, with Lauren Mallory and Jessica Stanley in the novel becoming the character of Jessica in the film, and a "compilation of a couple of different human characters" becoming Eric Yorkie. About these variances from the book, Mooradian stated, "I think we did a really judicious job of distilling [the book]. Our greatest critic, Stephenie Meyer, loves the screenplay, and that tells me that we made all the right choices in terms of what to keep and what to lose. Invariably, you're going to lose bits and pieces that certain members of the audience are going to desperately want to see, but there's just a reality that we're not making 'Twilight: The Book' the movie."

Casting

Several actresses, including Lily Collins and Jennifer Lawrence, screen tested for the role of Bella Swan, while Hardwick desired to test Kristen Stewart, who she had saw in Into the Wild and became her first choice for the part. Stewart eventually agreed to met Hardwicke while working on the film Adventureland, and Hardwicke visited her in Philadelphia with actor Jackson Rathbone, who was in contention to portray Edward Cullen, for an informal screen test that "captivated" the director. After casting Stewart as Bella, Hardwicke had trouble finding an actor otherworldly enough to play Edward Cullen. Rathbone, Shiloh Fernandez, Ben Barnes, and Robert Pattinson were the final four up for the role. Hardwicke did not initially choose Pattinson for Edward Cullen, with him arriving at her house in Venice, Los Angeles for a test, according to Hardwicke, "kind of wild-looking" with "scraggly, black dyed hair, and a stain on his shirt", while also having, according to Pattinson, a "hairless, chubby body" from "drinking beer all day" for a few months. After an audition on her bed, however, where Pattinson kissed Stewart for the screen test and fell out of the bed, he was selected. Hardwicke said, "Kristen was like, 'It's got to be Rob!' She felt connected to him from the first moment. That electricity, or love at first sight, or whatever it is." Hardwicke gave him the part, as long as he got in shape and made a promise. "'You've got to realize that Kristen is 17 years old'", Hardwicke told him. "'She's underage. You've got to focus, dude, or you're going to be arrested.' I made him swear on a stack of Bibles." Pattinson was unfamiliar with the book series prior to his screen test but read the books later on. Meyer even allowed him to view a manuscript of the unfinished Midnight Sun, which chronicles the events in Twilight from Edward's point of view. Fan reaction to Pattinson's casting as Edward was initially negative; Rachelle Lefèvre remarked that "[e]very woman had their own Edward [that] they had to let go of before they could open up to [him], which they did." Meyer was "excited" and "ecstatic" in response to the casting of the two main characters. She had expressed interest in having Emily Browning and Henry Cavill cast as Bella and Edward, respectively, prior to pre-production.

Peter Facinelli was chosen to play Carlisle Cullen, though he was not the first choice by Summit, revealing, "Hardwicke liked me, but there was another actor that the studio was pushing for." For unknown reasons, that actor was not able to play the part and Facinelli was selected in his place. Elizabeth Reaser was hired as Esme Cullen, despite only knowing in the audition that the film was based on a novel. Jackson Rathbone, who was in the final mix for Edward, was cast as Jasper Hale. The choice of Ashley Greene to portray Alice Cullen was the subject of fan criticism due to Greene being  taller than her character as described in the novel. Meyer had also stated that Rachael Leigh Cook resembled her vision of Alice. Nikki Reed was cast as Rosalie Hale. Reed had previously worked with Hardwicke on Thirteen, which they wrote together, and Lords of Dogtown. Reed commented, "I don't want to say it's a coincidence, because we do work well together, and we have a great history. I think we make good work, but it's more that the people that hire [Hardwicke] to direct a film of theirs [have] most likely seen her other work." After an open casting call, Taylor Lautner was cast as Jacob Black. Kellan Lutz was in Africa shooting the HBO miniseries Generation Kill when the auditions for the character of Emmett Cullen were conducted. The role had already been cast by the time that pre-production ended in December 2007, but the actor who had been selected "fell through"; Lutz subsequently auditioned and was flown to Oregon, where Hardwicke personally chose him. Rachelle Lefèvre was interested in pursuing a role in the film because Hardwicke was attached to the project as director; there was also "the potential to explore a character, hopefully, over three films"; and she wanted to portray a vampire. She "thought that vampires were basically the best metaphor for human anxiety and questions about being alive." Christian Serratos initially auditioned for Jessica Stanley, but she "fell totally in love with Angela" after reading the novels and successfully took advantage of a later opportunity to audition for Angela Weber. The role of Jessica Stanley went to Anna Kendrick, who got the part after two mix-and-match auditions with various actors.

Filming and post-production
Principal photography took 44 days, after more than a week of rehearsals, and completed on May 2, 2008. Similar to her directorial debut Thirteen, Hardwicke opted for an extensive use of hand-held cinematography to make the film "feel real". Meyer visited the production set three times and was consulted on different aspects of the story; she also has a brief cameo in the film. Cast members who portrayed vampires avoided sunlight to make their skin pale, though makeup was also applied for that effect, and wore contact lenses: "We did the golden color because the Cullens have those golden eyes. And then, when we're hungry, we have to pop the black ones in," Facinelli explained. They also participated in rehearsals with a dance choreographer and observed the physicality of different panthera to make their bodily movements more elegant.

Scenes were filmed primarily in Portland, Oregon, including at the Cullen House, a striking glass-and-wood residence. Stunt work was done mainly by the cast. The fight sequence between Gigandet and Pattinson's characters in a ballet studio, which was filmed during the first week of production, involved a substantial amount of wire work because the vampires in the story have superhuman strength and speed. Gigandet incorporated mixed martial arts fighting moves in this sequence, which involved chicken and honey as substitutes for flesh. Bella, the protagonist, is unconscious during these events, and since the novel is told from her point of view, such action sequences are illustrative and unique to the film. Pattinson noted that maintaining one's center of gravity is difficult when doing wire work "because you have to really fight against it as well as letting it do what it needs to do." Lefèvre found the experience disorienting since forward motion was out of her control.

Instead of shooting at Forks High School itself, scenes taking place at the school were filmed at Kalama High School and Madison High School. Other scenes were filmed in St. Helens, and Hardwicke conducted some reshooting in Pasadena, California, in August. Twilight was originally scheduled to be theatrically released in the United States on December 12, 2008, but its release date was changed to November 21 after Harry Potter and the Half-Blood Prince was rescheduled for an opening in July 2009. Two teaser trailers, as well as some additional scenes, were released for the film, as well as a final trailer, which was released on October 9. A 15-minute excerpt of Twilight was presented during the International Rome Film Festival in Italy. The film received a rating of PG-13 from the Motion Picture Association of America for "some violence and a scene of sensuality".

Music

The score for Twilight was composed by Carter Burwell, with the rest of the soundtrack chosen by music supervisor Alexandra Patsavas. Meyer was consulted on the soundtrack, which includes music by Muse and Linkin Park, bands she listened to while writing the novels. The original soundtrack was released on November 4, 2008, by Chop Shop Records in conjunction with Atlantic Records. It debuted at number 1 on the Billboard 200.

Release

Box office
Twilight grossed over $7 million in ticket sales from midnight showings alone on November 21, 2008. The film is fifth overall on Fandango's list of top advance ticket sales, outranked only by its sequel the following year, Star Wars: Episode III – Revenge of the Sith (2005), The Dark Knight (2008), and Harry Potter and the Half-Blood Prince (2009). It grossed $35.7 million on its opening day. For its opening weekend in the United States and Canada, Twilight accumulated $69.6 million from 3,419 theaters at an average of $20,368 per theater. The film grossed $192,769,854 in the United States and Canada, and $214,417,861 in international territories for a total of $407,187,715. Its opening weekend gross was the highest ever of a female-directed film, surpassing that of Deep Impact (1998).

Critical reception
Based on 223 reviews collected by Rotten Tomatoes, the film has a rating of 49% and a weighted average score of 5.4/10. The website's critical consensus reads: "Having lost much of its bite transitioning to the big screen, Twilight will please its devoted fans, but do little for the uninitiated." On Metacritic, it has a weighted mean score of 56 based on 38 reviews from film critics, indicating "mixed or average reviews". Audiences surveyed by CinemaScore gave the film an average grade of "A−" on an A+ to F scale.

New York Press critic Armond White called the film "a genuine pop classic", and praised Hardwicke for turning "Meyer's book series into a Brontë-esque vision." Roger Ebert gave the film two-and-a-half stars out of four and wrote, "I saw it at a sneak preview. Last time I saw a movie in that same theater, the audience welcomed it as an opportunity to catch up on gossip, texting, and laughing at private jokes. This time the audience was rapt with attention". In his review for the Los Angeles Times, Kenneth Turan wrote, "Twilight is unabashedly a romance. All the story's inherent silliness aside, it is intent on conveying the magic of meeting that one special person you've been waiting for. Maybe it is possible to be 13 and female for a few hours after all". USA Today gave the film two out of four stars and Claudia Puig wrote, "Meyer is said to have been involved in the production of Twilight, but her novel was substantially more absorbing than the unintentionally funny and quickly forgettable film". Entertainment Weekly gave the film a "B" rating and Owen Gleiberman praised Hardwicke's direction: "She has reconjured Meyer's novel as a cloudburst mood piece filled with stormy skies, rippling hormones, and understated visual effects".

Home media

The film was released on DVD in North America on March 21, 2009, through midnight release parties, and sold over 3 million units in its first day. It was released on April 6, 2009 in the UK. Bonus features include about 10 to 12 extended or deleted scenes, montages and music videos, behind-the-scenes interviews, a "making-of" segment, and commentary featuring Hardwicke, Stewart, and Pattinson. The Blu-ray disc edition of the film was released on March 21, 2009, in select locations, but was made more widely available at further retailers on May 5, 2009. As of July 2012, the film has sold 11,242,519 units, earning $201,190,019.

The film and the next two installments of the Twilight Saga was rereleased as a triple feature with extended cuts on January 13, 2015.

Twilight was released on 4K Blu-ray on October 23, 2018.

Video game

A film trivia video game developed by Screenlife Games and published by Konami for the Wii, Nintendo DS, PC and iPhone was released alongside the second film.

Accolades
Since its release, Twilight has received numerous nominations and awards. In January 2009, Carter Burwell was nominated for Film Composer of the Year by the International Film Music Critics Association. Robert Pattinson won Bravo TV's A-List Award for A-List Breakout. At the 2009 MTV Movie Awards, Pattinson, who was nominated alongside Taylor Lautner, also won an award for Male Breakthrough Performance, "Decode" was nominated for Best Song from a Movie, Twilight won an award for Best Movie, Kristen Stewart won for Best Female performance, Stewart and Pattinson were awarded Best Kiss, and Pattinson and Cam Gigandet won an award for Best Fight. Christian Serratos won a Young Artist Award for Best Performance in a Feature Film: Supporting Young Actress. For the 2009 Teen Choice Awards, held on August 9, the film and its actors received a combined total of 12 nominations, nine of which the film won. At the 2009 Scream Awards, the film was nominated for nine awards, four of which it won. The film won two ALMA Awards for makeup and hairstyling. It also won the Public Choice Award at the World Soundtrack Awards, where Carter Burwell was also nominated for Composer of the Year. Catherine Hardwicke received a Young Hollywood Award for her directing. In addition, the film was nominated for Best Fantasy Film at the 35th Saturn Awards and two Grammy Awards.

Extended Edition
In 2015, Lionsgate released an Extended edition a bit over 4 minutes longer. It edits into the movie scenes already released as "Deleted Scenes" on previous DVD releases.

Sequel

MTV reported in February 2008 that Summit Entertainment intended to create a series of at least three films based on Meyer's books. The studio had optioned New Moon, the second book in the series, by October 2008, and confirmed their plans to make a film based on it November 22, 2008. Because Catherine Hardwicke had wanted more preparation time than Summit's schedule for the production and release of the sequel would provide, Chris Weitz was selected to direct it in December 2008.

See also

 Apotamkin, Bella's Google hit for the cold ones
 Vampire film

References

External links

 
 
 
 
 
 

2008 films
2000s adventure films
2000s high school films
2000s romantic fantasy films
2000s teen romance films
American baseball films
Supernatural drama films
American fantasy adventure films
American high school films
American romantic fantasy films
American teen romance films
Films directed by Catherine Hardwicke
Films scored by Carter Burwell
Films set in Phoenix, Arizona
Films set in Washington (state)
Films shot in Los Angeles County, California
Films shot in Oregon
Films shot in Washington (state)
Films with screenplays by Melissa Rosenberg
Summit Entertainment films
Temple Hill Entertainment films
Teen adventure films
2000s teen fantasy films
1
American vampire films
Films produced by Wyck Godfrey
2000s English-language films
2000s American films